Mita y mita is a Mexican sitcom that premiered on Las Estrellas on August 30, 2017 and ended on November 29, 2017. The series is produced by Pitipol Ibarra for Televisa, based on the series Easy Money written by Shmulik Levy. It stars Martín Altomaro, Magali Boysselle, Damayanti Quintanar, and Dino García.

The series's name is a common shortening of "mitad y mitad", literally meaning half and half.

The series revolves around Néstor, a disobliged fifty year old, who wins the lottery and must share his prize with his wife, Olivia.

Plot 
Néstor is maintained by his wife Olivia, she is fed up with the situation and asks for a divorce, but just when he is about to stay on the street, he receives a stroke of luck that changes his destiny. Néstor wins the lottery, 200 million pesos, which by law he will have to share with his wife Olivia, but he will not be willing to share his money with the woman he loathes with all his soul. For Néstor, the solution will be to reconquer his wife and thus avoid the divorce that will force him to share his fortune. To achieve that goal, he'll need the help of his close friends Silvio and Mariana.

When Olivia discloses to her father her wishes to divorce Néstor, he informs her that the papers she recently signed gave her ownership of his valuable law firm and divorcing Néstor would mean giving Néstor half of this fortune. Reluctantly, Olivia will have to reconquer her husband and avoid divorcing in order to keep from sharing her new found wealth.

Cast

Main 
 Martín Altomaro as Néstor, when he wins the lottery, he is disappointed to know that he could lose half if he divorces his wife.
 Magali Boysselle as Olivia, she goes into crisis easily if things do not go as she wants and what she wants is a divorce.
 Damayanti Quintanar as Mariana, she is the sensitive, loving and tender best friend of Nestor, who is in love with him.
 Dino García as Silvio, he is Néstor's best friend who accompanies him in all his adventures.

Episodes

Awards and nominations

References

External links 
 

Las Estrellas original programming
Mexican television sitcoms
2017 Mexican television series debuts
2017 Mexican television series endings
Television series by Televisa